The Hamam Mosque is a cultural heritage monument in Peć, Kosovo.

Built around 1587, the mosque lies near the Haxhi Bey hamam and the oldest Albanian language school in the city. Also known as Bulla Zade Hasan, the mosque saw fires in 1890 and during World War I, but was rebuilt five years after the war. Graves of different ages dot the mosque's courtyard. The original portico had a shadirvan (ablution fountain) to its right. Inside are prayer rooms, a müezzin mahfili (balcony for the call to prayer), a minbar (pulpit for the imam), and an entrance door to the minaret. The minaret is carved from stone and includes 12 corners with an arch on each. The porch is a recent addition, and in general the building has been extensively renovated to conform to its surroundings, the last time being a 2001 restoration following its burning during the Kosovo War in 1999.

References

Mosques in Kosovo
Religious buildings and structures in Peja